The Hollywood Sci-Fi Museum, SciFi World Tour, Hollywood Science Fiction Museum, or Star Trek Enterprise Bridge Restoration is a proposed museum created by Huston Huddleston in August 2012.   As of 2022, no permanent facility has been found for the museum or its collection. As of 2018, CEO is John Purdy, former producer of the Star Trek Tours and Titanic Tour.

Mission

The mission of the Hollywood Science Fiction Museum is to "inspire people of all ages with an uplifting vision of the future found in science fiction media, art, and literature by teaching real science through science fiction, including technology, ecology, engineering, computers, robotics, math, space travel, and all aspects of filmmaking through interactive exhibits and programs".

Hollywood Science Fiction Foundation
The Hollywood Science Fiction Foundation is the nonprofit organization behind the development of The Hollywood Sci-Fi Museum, and was founded to fund and oversee the restoration process of the Paramount-built Star Trek Enterprise-D display bridge. The Hollywood Science Fiction Foundation was founded by Huston Huddleston.

History
The project began in 2012 with the rescuing of the Paramount-built Star Trek: The Next Generation and Star Trek: The Original Series Enterprise Bridge sets created for touring in 1997, with the intention of restoring both and putting them on display. The nonprofit New Starship Foundation was formed with board members made up of the original writers, producers and designers of Star Trek, with campaigns on Kickstarter and Indiegogo raising $76,000 of the $250,000 needed to restore the Enterprise D Bridge set.

On May 6, 2014, The "New Starship Foundation" began its Kickstarter campaign to fund the proposed Hollywood Science Fiction Museum, designating those monies collected to build a temporary museum that will be open in 2015, while a larger permanent facility scheduled to be open in 2018. On June 15, 2014, the Foundation surpassed its $82,000 goal via crowdfunding.

According to Huddleston, the permanent museum will be located North Hollywood, California, at a location next to its sister museum, the Hollywood Horror Museum.

In April 2018, Huston Huddleston was arrested on three felony charges related to child pornography, eventually pleading guilty to one misdemeanor charge of possessing child pornography. Following this, the board of directors list was scrubbed from both Foundation museum websites, and individual members have publicly distanced themselves from the project.

In 2019, the Hollywood Science Fiction museum was re-branded as the "SciFi World Tour"  and John Purdy, former director of Star Trek World Tour, became the new CEO.

Related links
The Science Fiction Museum and Hall of Fame in Seattle, Washington

References

External links

Official website of the Hollywood Sci-Fi Museum

2015 establishments in California
History museums in California
Media museums in California
North Hollywood, Los Angeles
Proposed museums in the United States
Science fiction organizations
Science museums in California